Tharrawaddy Min (14 March 1787 – 17 November 1846) was the 8th king of the Konbaung Dynasty of Burma. He repudiated the Treaty of Yandabo and almost went to war with the British.

Tharrawaddy was born Maung Khin to Crown Prince Thado Minsaw (son of King Bodawpaya) and Princess Min Kye on 14 March 1787. When his elder brother Bagyidaw ascended the throne in 1819, Tharrawaddy was appointed Heir Apparent. As crown prince, he fought in the First Anglo-Burmese War. In February 1837, he raised the standard of rebellion after escaping to Shwebo, the ancestral place of the Konbaung kings. Tharrawaddy succeeded in overthrowing Bagyidaw in April and was crowned king. Princess Min Myat Shwe, a granddaughter of Hsinbyushin, whom he married in 1809, was crowned as his chief queen (Nanmadaw Mibaya Hkaungyi).

His reign was rife with rumours of preparations for another war with the British who had added the Arakan and Tenasserim to their dominions. It was, however, not until 1852, after Tharrawaddy was succeeded by his son Pagan Min, that the Second Anglo-Burmese War broke out.

References

External links

Konbaung dynasty
People of the First Anglo-Burmese War
1787 births
1846 deaths
19th-century Burmese monarchs